Ben Spies (born July 11, 1984), is an American former professional motorcycle road racer. He was sometimes nicknamed "Elbows" due to his riding style, in which his elbows protruded outward.
 
For 2009 he raced in the Superbike World Championship series for the Yamaha Italia team; winning the championship in his rookie year by six points over rival Noriyuki Haga. He started racing on Yamaha YSR50cc bikes with the Central Motorcycle Roadracing Association in Texas when he was 8 years old. On October 26, 2013, Spies announced his retirement from motorcycle racing after two debilitating crashes left him with permanent shoulder injuries.

Career

Early career
Born in Memphis, Tennessee, Spies started riding motorcycles at the age of five and racing with CMRA at the age of eight in 1993. In 1994, he won a YSR championship followed by an 80cc championship the following season. At age 12, he started riding 125 Grand Prix bikes, traveling to WERA races outside of Texas. At age 14, Spies started riding 600s, winning more championships. He signed with Suzuki in 2000 at the age of 15, and began his AMA career.

AMA Superbike Championship

In 2000 Spies raced with the Valvoline Suzuki team. He took a season-best 5th-place finish at the Pikes Peak International Raceway round of the AMA 750 Supersport series, won the AMA Horizon Award for road racing. In late 2000 he qualified on the front row for his debut in the AMA Supersport Championship series.

Again with Valvoline Suzuki in 2001, Spies won the Pikes Peak round of the AMA 750 SuperStock Championship, and took four additional series podium finishes. American Suzuki then removed him from the team and placed in with Attack Suzuki.

For 2002 Spies joined the Attack Suzuki team, paired with Jason Pridmore. He earned three top-five finishes in AMA Supersport, and four top-five finishes in AMA Formula Xtreme. He was troubled by a knee injury for much of the season.

Now with American Suzuki team, Spies won the 2003 AMA Formula Xtreme Championship with five wins and two additional podium finishes. He also contested the AMA Supersport series, earning a win at Road Atlanta and taking two additional podium finishes. His best AMA Superbike result this year was seventh-place at Daytona Intl Speedway

Again with American Suzuki team in 2004, Spies raced in the AMA Supersport Championship, earning a win at Infineon Raceway and taking two additional series podium finishes. He earned wins in the AMA Superstock Championship races at California Speedway and Road Atlanta, and earned two additional podium finishes in the series.

In 2005 Spies won the AMA Superbike race at California Speedway and earned 13 additional podium finishes. He was runner-up for the AMA Superbike title, and raced in AMA Supersport, earning five top-five finishes.

Spies joined the Yoshimura Suzuki team in 2006. He won the AMA Superbike Championship title with 10 wins and seven additional podium finishes. Spies took six successive wins early in the 2006 season, and went on to win the title over his teammate, 6-time series Champion Mat Mladin, by 649 points to 641. In total he took 7 poles and 17 podiums, and lead the most laps 10 times. Spies also raced in select AMA Supersport events, earning a podium finish at Mazda Raceway Laguna Seca.

 produced the tightest championship battle in the history of the series, Spies winning a second AMA Superbike Championship by a single point over Mladin. Spies collected seven wins and 12 additional podium finishes during the season. He captured Superbike pole position at nine events, and also won the AMA Superstock title with seven wins and seven pole positions.

In 2008 Spies won his third straight AMA Superbike Championship to become only the fourth rider in the history of the series to win the title three consecutive times (after Reg Pridmore, Fred Merkel and Mat Mladin, who accomplished the feat twice). This included an AMA Superbike record of seven successive wins.

MotoGP World Championship (2008–2009)
Spies started as a wild-card in place of injured Loris Capirossi at the British GP on June 22, 2008. An outing that saw him qualify in 8th on the grid and finish in 14th place, scoring his first MotoGP points. This was in addition to two pre-planned rides at both U.S. rounds. He tested for Rizla Suzuki at Indianapolis on July 2, 2008, in preparations for the new U.S. Grand Prix. Top ten finishes followed at both Mazda Raceway Laguna Seca in 8th and in 6th at Indianapolis.

He was not offered a full-time ride by Suzuki for 2009 with all the success he gave to Suzuki and had an option year in his contract. The decision was made by Mel Harris who now is no longer with Suzuki. Masayuki Itoh retired because of the departure of Spies.

Superbike World Championship

On October 1, 2008, it was confirmed that Spies would join the Superbike World Championship for the 2009 season, riding for the factory Yamaha Italia team. He took pole position for his very first race meeting. He ran off the track on the first lap in race one (recovering to finish sixteenth despite a second incident) but was victorious in race 2 to become the first American to win a WSBK race since Colin Edwards in 2002.

Spies further impressed the world motorcycle racing community by winning both races of the second round in Losail, Qatar. En route, he again secured pole, the subsequent race wins, the fastest lap and the outright circuit lap record.

Spies made history on May 30, 2009 at Miller Motorsports Park. Winning his 7th consecutive pole position during Saturday's Superpole qualifying, Spies broke the long-standing record of 6 consecutive poles set in 1991 by fellow Texan Doug Polen. The pole set a number of records, including most consecutive pole positions in a season, most poles to start a season, and most in a row by a rookie. On October 24, 2009 at Portimão Circuit in Portugal he set a new record securing his 11th pole of his rookie season. This despite having no previous experience at the majority of circuits on the WSBK calendar.

On October 25, 2009 at the final round of the Championship at Portimão, Spies was crowned the 2009 Superbike World Champion after winning Race One, in conjunction with a fall from title rival Noriyuki Haga, and a solid 5th place in Race 2.

MotoGP World Championship (2010–2013)

2009
On October 1, 2009, Yamaha officially confirmed that Spies would replace James Toseland at the Yamaha Tech 3 team for the 2010 MotoGP Championship. Two days later it was confirmed that Spies would ride as a wildcard for the Yamaha Sterilgarda team, in the final MotoGP race of the season at Valencia in November,. Spies began the race from 12th place, but made his way through the pack, finishing in seventh place.

2010
Spies started the season with fifth place at Losail, his best ever on a MotoGP bike, before retiring in the next two races with a mechanical problem at Jerez and a crash at Le Mans. Spies took his first MotoGP podium at Silverstone in Great Britain, taking a third-place finish. Spies took second place from pole at home at Indianapolis. He finished the 2010 MotoGP season in sixth place, securing Rookie of the Year honours.

2011
He started the season with a sixth-place finish in Qatar, before crashing out of the next two races at Jerez and Estoril. After another sixth place in France, Spies achieved his first podium of the season with a third place in Catalunya, having held off Repsol Honda's Andrea Dovizioso. Spies suffered another crash at the British Grand Prix, crashing out at Turn 1 in wet conditions. Two weeks later, Spies narrowly missed out on pole position for the Dutch TT in Assen; he qualified second, just 0.009 seconds behind Gresini Racing's Marco Simoncelli. Spies and teammate Lorenzo jumped ahead of Simoncelli at the start, and took the first two placings into the first corner. Simoncelli and Lorenzo later made contact and both riders fell, giving Spies a 2.5-second lead after the first lap. Spies extended his advantage to almost eight seconds by the end of the race, and took his first MotoGP win in the process.

After his win at Assen, Spies finished each of the following five races in the top five, taking fourth places at Mugello and Laguna Seca, fifth places at the Sachsenring and Brno, and concluding the streak with his third podium of the season – a third place – at the Indianapolis Grand Prix. Having qualified second, Spies made contact on the first lap with Dovizioso, and as a result, fell to as low as ninth place before making several late braking moves to progress through the order. Sixth at Misano was followed by fifth at Aragón and another sixth at Motegi helped to maintain his fifth place in the championship. However, his injuries forced him to pull out on race morning, and were also a factor in his similar withdrawal from the Malaysian Grand Prix, having qualified 16th out of the 17 riders and after two further practice crashes. Spies finished the season with a second-place finish in Valencia, missing out on victory at the line, to Casey Stoner by just 0.015 seconds, having capitalised on a previous error by Stoner to take the lead.

His biography "Taking It To The Next Level" was published by David Bull Publishing and was launched at the Indianapolis Grand Prix on August 26, 2011.

2012
Spies remained with the factory Yamaha team into the  season, again partnering Jorge Lorenzo. Spies placed eleventh in the first two races of the season in Qatar and Jerez, before taking his first top ten with eighth in Portugal. After missing out on the points at Le Mans, Spies finished tenth in Catalunya before three top-five finishes in succession; he took a fifth-place finish at Silverstone before a pair of fourths at Assen and the Sachsenring. He finished eleventh at Mugello, falling 119 points behind teammate Lorenzo in the standings. He retired from each of the following three races, before taking a pair of fifth-place finishes at the Grands Prix in San Marino and Aragon. An issue with his bike's brakes forced a retirement in Japan, while he crashed out in Malaysia; he suffered injuries in the accident which ruled him out for the rest of the season. He finished tenth in the final championship standings, with 88 points.

On July 24, it was announced that Spies would leave the factory Yamaha team at the end of the 2012 season, making way for the returning Valentino Rossi. On September 12, it was announced that Spies would remain in MotoGP for the  season, joining the satellite Pramac Racing Ducati squad as part of a two-rider team alongside Moto2 graduate Andrea Iannone.

2013
After finishing the first two races of the season with the Pramac Ducati squad, he was out of many races due to injury. He made an attempt to return at Indianapolis, but crashed and suffered more injuries, ruling him out for most of the rest of the season. However, on October 26, during the Japanese GP weekend at Motegi, he announced his retirement from racing due to his injuries.

Career statistics

All-time statistics

Grand Prix motorcycle racing

Races by year
(key) (Races in bold indicate pole position, races in italics indicate fastest lap)

Superbike World Championship

Races by year
(key) (Races in bold indicate pole position, races in italics indicate fastest lap)

See also
List of AMA Superbike champions
List of Superbike World champions

References

External links
BenSpies.com – Official site
Ben Spies profile at AMAProRacing.com
Ben Spies profile at WorldSBK.com
Ben Spies profile at MotoGP.com

1984 births
Living people
American people of German descent
Sportspeople from Memphis, Tennessee
American motorcycle racers
AMA Superbike Championship riders
Yamaha Motor Racing MotoGP riders
Superbike World Championship riders
People from Germantown, Tennessee
Tech3 MotoGP riders
Pramac Racing MotoGP riders
MotoGP World Championship riders